Blue and Sentimental is a 1994 studio album by Cleo Laine.

Track listing
 "The Lies of Handsome Men" (Francesca Blumenthal)
 "I've Got a Crush on You" (George Gershwin, Ira Gershwin)
 "Blue and Sentimental" (Count Basie, Mack David, Jerry Livingston)
 "Afterglow" (Carroll Coates)
 "Not You Again" (Duncan Lamont)
 "Primrose Colour Blue" (John Dankworth, Cleo Laine)
 "What'll I Do?" (Irving Berlin)
 "Love Me (If It Takes All Night Long)" (Kansas Joe McCoy)
 "Creole Love Call" (Duke Ellington)
 "Dreamsville" (Ray Evans, Jay Livingston, Henry Mancini)
 "A Cryin' Shame" (John Dankworth)
 "Love Comes and Goes" (Carroll Coates)
 "Soft Pedal Blues" (Bessie Smith)

References

1994 albums
Cleo Laine albums
RCA Records albums